The discography of American alternative rock band Switchfoot consists of 12 studio albums, four live albums, three compilation albums, five video albums, 10 extended plays, 43 singles, nine promotional singles and 39 music videos. The band, originally called Chin Up, consists of singer/guitarist and primary songwriter Jon Foreman, bassist Tim Foreman, drummer Chad Butler and synthesizer/keyboardist/guitarist Jerome Fontamillas. Lead guitarist Drew Shirley left the band in February 2022.

Albums

Studio albums

Live albums

Compilation albums

Video albums

Extended plays

Singles

Radio singles

Promotional singles

Other charted songs

Music videos

Original compilation appearances

B-sides

Covers
Switchfoot/Jon Foreman have performed several covers live, and in studio. For official purposes, only published covers have been posted below.
 Respect by Aretha Franklin (around 2003)
 God Only Knows by The Beach Boys (2005)
 Crazy in Love by Beyoncé (2006-2007)
 I Won't Back Down by Tom Petty (2008-2009)
 Lucky Man by The Verve (2010)
 Sabotage by Beastie Boys (2010)
 Sorrow by Bad Religion (2010)
 Wouldn't It Be Nice by The Beach Boys (2015)
 Livin' on a Prayer by Bon Jovi (2019)

Notes

References

External links
 Official website
 Switchfoot at AllMusic
 

Rock music group discographies
Discographies of American artists
Christian music discographies
Discography